Iryna Vladyslavivna Volynets (1 December 1980) is a Ukrainian Paraympic archer. Master of Sports of Ukraine of international class.

Volynets participated in the 2008 Summer Paralympics, 2012 Summer Paralympics, 2016 Summer Paralympics, the 2015 World Cup and the European Championship 2016.

Volynets is engaged in archery at the Ivano-Frankivsk Regional Center for Physical Culture and Sports for the Disabled "Invasport". Volynets’ coach is Oleh Ilyashenko.

In 2013 she represented Ivano-Frankivsk Regional Center "Invasport" in the Winter Championship of Ukraine in archery among athletes with musculoskeletal disorders that took place in Lviv winning 2 silver medals.

References 

1980 births
Ukrainian female archers
Paralympic archers of Ukraine
Living people
Archers at the 2008 Summer Paralympics
Archers at the 2012 Summer Paralympics
Archers at the 2016 Summer Paralympics
21st-century Ukrainian women